Absolutely is the second studio album from the British ska band Madness. The album reached number 2 in the UK album charts.

Absolutely spawned some of the band's biggest hits, most notably "Baggy Trousers", which peaked at number 3 in the UK and spent more than four months in the singles chart. "Embarrassment" reached number 4, and the instrumental "The Return of the Los Palmas 7" climbed to number 7. Although the album reviews were generally less enthusiastic than those of One Step Beyond..., they were mostly positive.

In 2009 and 2010, Madness re-released their back-catalogue of studio albums up to and including 1999's Wonderful with a bonus CD and extra tracks. The re-release of Absolutely has seven bonus tracks plus an additional CD featuring a 1980 concert recorded at the Hammersmith Odeon.

In a 2020 interview with GQ magazine Lee Thompson said it was his favourite Madness album.

Album title
The album is named after one of the oft-said expressions of the band's then tour manager and sound man Tony Duffield.

Cover

The front cover sees the band standing in front of Chalk Farm tube station in Camden. When the original vinyl was released the first, more sombre, cover photograph was changed to a more animated pose after around 10,000 albums were pressed. The two sleeves can be distinguished by keyboardist Mike Barson's holding of the umbrella: in the earlier pressing he holds it up to his chin while in the later, and subsequently used, releases the umbrella is on the ground.

The inner sleeve features a London Underground-style roundel for a railway station called "Cairo East" on one side (this roundel later reappeared in the video for "(Waiting For) The Ghost Train") and a history of the group on the other. The "Cairo East" roundel is illustrated by painter, and former bass player with Kilburn and the High Roads, Humphrey Ocean.

Critical reception

The album received mixed reviews at the time of release. Billboard recommended Absolutely to consumers, noting that it was "less gimmicky and more R&B/funk oriented" than Madness' debut album One Step Beyond..., while still retaining enough of the band's "'nutty' sound" to appeal to fans of the debut. Greil Marcus, however, likened Madness to "the Blues Brothers with English accents" in a scathing review for Rolling Stone that also took aim at fellow ska revivalists the Specials. 

In a retrospective review, AllMusic's Stephen Thomas Erlewine wrote, "Absolutely does motor ahead on breakneck ska rhythms, but it never quite feels as raw as its predecessor, and that hint of gloss serves the three big hit singles very well." Erlewine felt that Absolutely usually delivers more of the same as the debut in "a highly appealing fashion."

Track listing

2010 reissue

Personnel
Madness
 Graham "Suggs" McPherson – lead vocals, percussion
 Mike Barson – piano, organ, vibraphone, marimba, harmonica
 Chris Foreman – guitar, sitar, slide guitar
 Lee Thompson – tenor and baritone saxophones
 Daniel Woodgate – drums, fire extinguisher
 Mark Bedford – bass guitar
 Chas Smash – backing vocals, trumpet, lead vocals on "Solid Gone"

Technical
 Clive Langer – producer
 Alan Winstanley – producer
 Humphrey Ocean – inner sleeve illustration

2010 reissue
 Jeff Griffin – producer on disc two
 Tim Turan – remastering
 Martin "Cally" Callomon – art direction, design
 Paul Lester – liner notes

Chart performance

Certifications and sales

References

External links

Madness (band) albums
1980 albums
Stiff Records albums
Albums produced by Alan Winstanley
Albums produced by Clive Langer